Paddy Phelan (9 February 1938 – 7 July 2016) was an English cricketer. He played for Essex between 1958 and 1965. Phelan died on 7 July 2016.

References

External links

1938 births
2016 deaths
English cricketers
Essex cricketers
People from Chingford
Marylebone Cricket Club cricketers
Cambridgeshire cricketers
Combined Services cricketers